Grotli is a village in Skjåk Municipality in Innlandet county, Norway. The area has a hotel and skiing centre as well as a few permanent residents and a number of holiday cottages. The Norwegian National Road 15 runs through the village.

References

Skjåk
Villages in Innlandet